"Free to Love Again" is a song by British celebrity and former glamour model Katie Price. It was released as a non-album single on 12 July 2010 for digital download.

Composition 
Reality TV star Heidi Montag expressed praise for the single and suggested doing a remix and music video with Price for a U.S.-release via her Twitter.

Track listing 
Digital download
 "Free to Love Again" – 3:46

Live performances 
Price performed "Free to Love Again" on GMTV to promote the single on 16 July 2010. She said she didn't write or produce the song, and that she had not been lip-synching like most people thought she was.
Price also performed the song at G-A-Y in London.

Charts

Release history

References

External links 
 
 

2010 singles
Katie Price songs
2010 songs